Cypripedium molle is a species of orchid native to Puebla and Oaxaca, Mexico.

Cypripedium molle can have as many as 12 stems, each bearing up to 5 pale yellow flowers.

References

molle
Orchids of Mexico
Flora of Puebla
Flora of Oaxaca
Plants described in 1840